Fourni may refer to:

 Fourni Korseon,  an archipelago in the Aegean Sea
 Phourni or Fourni, the archaeological site of an ancient Minoan cemetery in Crete

See also 
 Furni (disambiguation)